"Funkdafied" is the lead single released from Da Brat's debut album of the same name.

Background
The song was both produced and written by Jermaine Dupri and contained a sample of the Isley Brothers 1983 hit "Between the Sheets", for which the brothers and Chris Jasper were given songwriting credits. "Funkdafied" also uses the rap from the intro of "Gimme the Funk," the 1982 release by Charades. Both songs feature the rap parody in their intros, which satirizes the standard oath taken in sworn testimony, “Do you swear to give me the funk, the whole funk, and nothing but the funk...I do”  
The single was released in the summer of 1994 and quickly became a hit, reaching number six on the Billboard Hot 100 and number two on the R&B charts (held from the top spot by Janet Jackson's "Any Time, Any Place") and number one on Hot Rap Singles. To date, "Funkdafied" remains Da Brat's most successful single and is her only single to have been certified platinum for shipments exceeding one million copies, earning the certification on August 16, 1994. By the end of the year, it had sold 800,000 copies. It reached No. 37 on the Billboard Year-End Hot 100 singles of 1994 as one of the year's most successful singles.

Music video
The music video was directed by David Nelson and premiered in the summer of 1994.

Single track listing
"Funkdafied"   
"Funkdafied" (Rated R)   
"Funkdafied" (Instrumental)   
"Funkdafied" (A Cappella)

Charts

Weekly charts

Year-end charts

Certifications

References

1994 singles
Da Brat songs
Song recordings produced by Jermaine Dupri
Songs written by Jermaine Dupri
Songs written by Chris Jasper
G-funk songs
1994 songs